Dongyuan County is a county in Heyuan, Guangdong Province, China.

Transport
Heyuan North railway station on Ganzhou-Shenzhen high-speed railway is located here.

County-level divisions of Guangdong
Heyuan